Perry County is a county located in the U.S. state of Tennessee. As of the 2020 census, the population was 8,366, with an average population density of 18.6 persons per square mile (7.2 persons per square km) it is the least densely populated county in Tennessee. Its county seat and largest town is Linden. It is named after American naval commander and War of 1812 hero Oliver Hazard Perry.

In 1806, the Cherokee ceded to the United States the land that would later become Perry County in the Treaty of Washington. The county was established by the Tennessee General Assembly in 1819 from parts of Wayne County, Hickman County, and Humphreys County. In 1846, the portions of Perry County located west of the Tennessee River were split off to form Decatur County.

Agriculture and forestry are the largest components of the local economy, supplemented by light industry and tourism. Perry County is one of the most economically disadvantaged counties in the state. It was severely impacted by the Great Recession of 2008, at one point having the second highest unemployment rate in the United States, and  continues to lag behind the rest of the state in various economic indicators, including income inequality and poverty rates. Transportation infrastructure in the county is limited, with no access to railroads, commercial airports or riverports, or freeways.

Over 80% of the county is forested. The county's terrain is largely defined by its two major rivers, the Buffalo and the Tennessee, and features ridges and valleys that form tributaries to the rivers. Agriculture and outdoor recreation benefit from plentiful fresh water sources, fertile crop land, and abundant wildlife. Mousetail Landing State Park is the largest protected area in the county and a significant driver of nature tourism in the area.

History

Prehistory and early settlement
There is paleontological evidence of the presence of prehistoric megafauna in the county. In September 1820, the skeletal remains of a large animal, possibly a giant ground sloth (Megalonyx), were excavated in an unidentified cave in the county. The remains were reportedly recovered by a Nashville museum operator and collector, but have since been lost. Archaeological evidence suggests a significant population of mound building Native Americans in the county, with a number of mounds located near the Tennessee River at Lady's Bluff. Archaeological surveys conducted in the 1970s and 1980s discovered evidence of early Archaic through late Woodland settlement concentrated in bottomland (low-lying alluvial land) in the Tennessee River basin near Mousetail Landing, with evidence of Paleoindian occupation in one site. Arrowheads and spear tips associated the Mississippian, Woodland, and Copena cultures have been found along the Tennessee River tributaries in the western half of the county.

On January 7, 1806, with the signing of the Treaty of Washington, the Cherokee ceded to the United States a large tract of territory in the south-central portion of Tennessee that included the area that would become Perry County. Permanent settlement by people of European descent along with enslaved people of African descent began shortly after this treaty was ratified. The area was found to have very productive bottomland with an abundance of water, timber, and wild game. The earliest settlers likely arrived from nearby counties in Middle Tennessee, although some did immigrate to the area from North Carolina, Alabama, and Kentucky.

Between 1810 and 1812, the first gristmill in the area was established on Cane Creek. The first known birth of a person of European descent in the area occurred in 1818 along Toms Creek. Some of the early settlers were veterans of the War of 1812, and some had probably received land grants in the area from the state of North Carolina for service in the American Revolution.

Formation and early history
In 1819, the Tennessee General Assembly passed an act providing "that a new county be established north of Wayne, west of Hickman, and south of Humphreys, by the name of Perry County, beginning at the southeast corner of Humphreys, running west, thence south, thence east, thence north to place of beginning, and to include all the territory lying between Humphreys, Hardin, Wayne and Hickman Counties." The county, named in honor of Oliver Hazard Perry, was officially organized that same year in the home of James Dixon near Lick Creek, which still stands today.

In 1820, the first court in the county was held in the same house under a Judge Humphreys, and the first school was established by Ferney Stanley on Toms Creek. In 1821, the county seat was established in Perryville, a river port located on the west bank of the Tennessee River.  A log courthouse was constructed in Perryville, but was later replaced with a brick structure. In 1830, the settlement of Beardstown was established on a high bluff overlooking the Buffalo River.

By the early 1830s, significant deposits of iron ore had been discovered in the county. Sufficient quantities were being extracted to justify the construction of a large iron ore furnace on Cedar Creek near the Tennessee River between 1832 and 1834. At its peak, it processed 1,400 tons of pig iron annually, using both free and enslaved labor, and taking advantage of the most advanced "hot blast" smelting techniques available at the time. The furnace shut down in 1862, during the Civil War, and was never brought back in to service. The Cedar Grove Iron Furnace is the only twin-stack iron furnace remaining in Tennessee. In addition to iron ore, some marble mining was conducted in the county in the middle of the 19th century.

In 1846, Decatur County was formed from the portions of Perry County west of the Tennessee River. The seat of government and courts were then temporarily relocated to a small town known as Harrisburg, located near the geographic center of the county. Around 1844, the community of Flatwoods, originally known as Whitaker's Bluff, was established along the Buffalo River in the southern part of the county by a group of settlers from Halifax, North Carolina. The land was divided into plots and a public square, and the plots were sold off to provide funds for the construction of public buildings. Linden was established as the county seat in 1848, where it remains today, and is the largest municipality in the county. A temporary structure to house the court was built in 1848, and was replaced by a wooden frame building in 1849. Harrisburg no longer exists as an organized entity or recognized location.

In 1850, it was reported that there were 10 grist mills, a saw mill, a furnace, and two tanneries in operation within the county. Additionally, 21 churches were organized, as well as 23 schools enrolling 685 students. Corn was the primary agricultural product at the time, though oats, sweet potatoes, and tobacco were also grown in smaller quantities.

By the late 1850s, allegations and rumors of an impending slave insurrection began to spread throughout the southern United States. In 1856, the panic reached Perry County, when multiple enslaved persons were murdered over rumors of the plotting of a revolt. The total number of people killed by so-called vigilance committees is unclear, with contemporary reports citing as many as 15 being hanged,  and later historical research noting between 10 and 12.

Civil War

In 1861, Perry County voted in favor of secession by a margin of 780 to 168. Even though the vote was overwhelmingly in favor of secession, the Unionist sentiment was strong and pervasive throughout the war, with men from the county volunteering for both sides in the conflict. About 300 men joined the Confederate Army, with about 200 joining the Union Army. One particularly notable Confederate unit formed in the county was Harder's Company of the 23rd Tennessee Infantry Regiment, raised in 1861 and composed of about 100 men from the Cedar Creek area. This unit fought throughout the war, seeing action at Fort Donelson, Shiloh, Stones River, Chickamagua, and the Siege of Petersburg, after which they surrendered with the Army of Northern Virginia in 1865. 

Both pro-Union and pro-Confederate irregular and guerrilla forces were organized in Perry County, and were known to have conducted raids on neighboring counties. Of note were the Perry County Jayhawkers, a group of Union-aligned partisans known to have engaged in fighting against opposing partisans in Hickman County and who burned the county seat of Centerville. Due to the rural, isolated nature of the region, away from the major railway lines and with only limited access to large landings on the Tennessee River, there were no large-scale engagements in the county. In February 1862, the Cedar Grove Iron Furnace was partially destroyed when it was shelled by Union gunboats USS Conestoga, USS Tyler, and USS Lexington. On April 27, 1862, a body was found by a group of children playing near Britt's Landing on the Tennessee River in Perry County. Investigation of papers found on the body revealed it to be that of Governor Louis P. Harvey of Wisconsin. Gov. Harvey had been conducting an inspection of hospitals where wounded soldiers were being treated after the Battle of Shiloh, and had drowned in the river on April 19 while returning to Wisconsin.

Breckenridge's raid on Linden
Before dawn on May 12, 1863, a flotilla under the command of Lt. Cmdr. The small force of 55 men led by Lt. Col William Breckenridge, a native of Perry County, approached Linden at daybreak. The Confederate forces, totaling about 100 men under Lt. Col. William Frierson, were preparing to depart Linden to join General Van Dorn's force at Spring Hill and were taken completely by surprise. After a short skirmish against pickets, the Union cavalry captured Lt. Col Frierson and 46 of his officers and men and killed three more before reinforcements could arrive. During this engagement, the county courthouse, which was being held by the Confederate forces, was burned, destroying most records from the early history of the county. The only Union loss during the engagement was one horse. Breckenridge then returned to the Tennessee River and transferred his prisoners to the awaiting riverboats for transportation to Cairo, Missouri. Intelligence gathered from the Confederates captured in the engagement provided significant details to Union leadership on the size, location, and intentions of Confederate forces in the Middle Tennessee, including plans to re-capture Fort Henry and attack Union forces under General Rosecrans. The amphibious landing and battle was recounted on the front page of the Sunday, May 17, 1863, edition of the New York Times. No further action took place in the county until September 27, 1864, when a detachment of Confederate cavalry conducted a raid on the county, skirmishing with Federal forces near Lobelville and Beardstown.

Reconstruction and the late 19th century
Martial law was lifted in the county in April 1865, when the civil court held its first session since Tennessee's secession and the beginning of the Civil War. In 1868, a new two-story brick courthouse was built to replace the one burned during the war. Perry County was not immune to Reconstruction era racial violence against Black citizens. In 1869, two Black men who had been arrested for unknown crimes were removed from the county jail by a mob and shot.

In the late 19th century, the county was largely known for its tanneries and peanut cultivation, producing over 500,000 bushels of peanuts per year by 1886. The first known Black-owned farm in the county was established in 1871 on the north fork of Lick Creek. Tapp Craig and his wife, Amy Guthrie, both former slaves, purchased the farm with a down payment of a yoke of oxen, and paid off the farm over the next two years. The farm, still owned by the Craig family, is listed in the National Register of Historic Places due to its significance in the history of Black farmers in Tennessee.

From about 1880 to 1884, the first regular newspaper in the county, the Linden Times, was published weekly. By the mid-1880s, the continued lack of railroad connections was reported as a cause for the lack of investment in the county. An 1886 editorial in the Nashville Daily American noted that many in the county were awaiting the construction of the proposed Nashville, Memphis, and Jackson Railroad, and viewed it as an essential step in the modernization and industrialization of the area. In 1887, Congress authorized the construction of a railroad bridge across the Tennessee River connecting Perry and Decatur counties. The Tennessee Midland Railroad laid tracks from Lexington, Tennessee to Perryville. While a terminus allowing the transfer of goods from rail to river shipping was constructed in Perryville, the bridge was never built and the railroad was never extended into Perry County. A second attempt to bring a railroad to Perry County was started around 1890 with construction beginning on the Florence Northern Railroad. Plans for the line's extension meant for it to eventually pass through Linden on its way from Florence, Alabama to Paducah, Kentucky. In 1894 the railroad was purchased by a Chattanooga company after about  had been graded, and construction was never completed.

20th century
Briefly, in the summer of 1903, Perry County was without a county government. That year the state legislature passed an act consolidating the civil districts in the county, and providing for a new special election to be held that would elect new officers. Due to an oversight in the writing of the act, the new county officers could not be seated until 30 days after the election.

By 1910, the population of the county peaked at 8,815. It then proceeded to decline to a low of 5,238 individuals in 1970, a number not seen since the census of 1830. During the First World War, a Selective Service Board was established in Linden. Over 1,500 men registered for the draft, and 254 individuals from Perry County served in the United States military from 1917 to 1919. Out of those who served, 10 were wounded and 27 were killed, a nearly 15% casualty rate.

In 1927, the county decided to renovate and expand the courthouse. In January 1928, the building burned as it was undergoing restoration. The county government decided to demolish the remains of the old courthouse and construct new, larger building in the Colonial Revival style which was completed that same year. Also in 1928, construction started on the first bridge across the Tennessee River in the county, connecting Perry and Decatur counties. The bridge, named after World War I Medal of Honor recipient Alvin C. York, was opened on July 5, 1930, as part of a major road building program to provide additional links between Memphis and Nashville. This bridge was later demolished and replaced by a modern concrete bridge in 1986. The construction of the road bridge and completion of the highway reduced demand for rail service in the area, and service to the rail terminal at Perryville was discontinued in 1936.

By the 1930s, Perry County had acquired a reputation as a hotbed of illicit alcohol production. Its isolated nature on the eastern edge of a Federal law enforcement district meant that prohibition officers rarely operated in the area, allowing moonshine operations to run unimpeded. Liquor would be distributed to dealers in neighboring Hickman County for sale. Recovery from the Great Depression was slow in the county. By the late 1940s, wages had improved from their nadir in the 1930s, although unemployment was high among the predominant industries of farming and forestry. Following this, businesses began to leave the county for locations nearer urban areas and adjacent to the highway; and when two garment factories and an automobile parts plant ceased operations, the conditions were set for long-term economic stagnation.

In 1971, an Old Order Mennonite community was established along Cane Creek near Lobelville. Both English as well as Plattdeutsch and Pennsylvania German speaking families settled in the area from other areas of Tennessee, from nearby states such as Arkansas, and internationally from Belize. This community generally avoids motor vehicles, except in certain limited situations sanctioned by their church, and most families are not connected to the electric grid.

Geography and geology

Perry County is located on the western edge of Middle Tennessee. The topography of Perry County is characterized by high ridges separating creeks flowing into the county's two rivers and is typical of the Western Highland Rim region of Tennessee.

Rivers

Three rivers are found within Perry County: the Tennessee River, Buffalo River, and Duck River. The Tennessee River runs along the western boundary of the county, Buffalo River bisects the county, and a bend of the Duck River crosses into the county very briefly in its far northeastern corner.

Tennessee River
The Tennessee River forms the western border of Perry County, dividing it from Decatur County and Benton County. It flows south to north and is navigable through the entire length of the county. In 1944, with the construction of Kentucky Dam, portions of low-lying land adjacent to the river were inundated, although the societal and environmental impact was substantially lower than areas farther downstream. While the presence of the dam allows for some level of control against regular, catastrophic flooding along the basin, some areas of the western portion of the county do become inundated after some flood events. At the National Weather Service designated flood stage of the river, portions of the county near Crooked Creek are inundated. At moderate and major flood stages, bottomland near Mousetail Landing State Park, Deer Creek, and Cedar Creek are inundated.

The river is narrow enough at this point that barges cannot pass side by side and must pass through individually. Lady's Bluff Small Wild Area is a small federally protected public access park that includes the bluff and surrounding woodland. One possibly apocryphal story of the origin of the name of the bluff stems from a supposed incident where a woman was kidnapped and used as bait for an ambush by Native Americans against white settlers encroaching on their land.

Buffalo River
The Buffalo River flows south to north through the county before entering the Duck River just north of the county line in Humphreys County, and over 25% of the river's total watershed area is within the county. The towns of Linden and Lobelville and the unincorporated communities of Flatwoods and Beardstown are located along the river. Four river outfitters are located along the river within the county and add to its value as a recreational river.

Topography and hydrography
Most of the western half of the county forms part of the watershed for the Tennessee River, while most of the eastern half drains into the Buffalo River. A very small portion of the far northeastern corner of the county drains into the Duck River. The water table is high due to the hard substrate, creating numerous springs and shallow wells, and is charged by the Highland Rim aquifer. Typical spring and well yields range from 1 to 400 gallons per minute (4.5 to 1820 liters per minute).

Buffalo Ridge bisects the county from north to south between the Tennessee and Buffalo rivers. These creeks are, from north to south, Blue Creek, Crooked Creek, Roans Creek, Toms Creek, Lick Creek, Spring Creek, Cypress Creek, Marsh Creek, and Cedar Creek. To the east of the Buffalo River, additional ridges run east to west, similar to the terrain west of Buffalo Ridge. These ridges form the basins for the main Buffalo River tributaries within the county, Coon Creek, Brush Creek, Hurricane Creek, Short Creek, and Cane Creek.

Large tracts of natural wetlands exist within the county. One estimate based on analysis of satellite photography by the Tennessee Valley Authority estimated approximately 5,200 acres of forested wetlands and 1,200 acres of non-forested wetlands. These wetlands occur primarily along stream courses, and are some of the most productive wildlife habitat in the region.

Soil and geology

Soil deposits from the three river drainages located in the county have created fertile bottomland that are used intensively for agricultural purposes. The soil profile is generally very deep, with slopes and soil types suitable for agriculture and building construction. The ridge tops are well drained and loamy, with significant chert rock deposits. Reserves of chert, sand, gravel, limestone, and phosphate can be found in the county. Cherty limestone deposits are the most extensive geologic feature of the county, and an impermeable siltstone and shale base below the chert formations has led to the emergence of numerous fresh water springs.

Blue and gray limestone outcrops are present in most valleys of the county. These limestone formations are part of the Lobelville formation of the Silurian Brownsport Group and of the Lower Helderberg Group. Significant numbers of fossils have been found in the limestone. By the late 1830s, the fossils of various newly cataloged species of mollusks and trilobites found in the county were described in reports to the General Assembly. Iron ore is extremely abundant, with numerous deposits to the west of Buffalo Ridge.

Adjacent counties
Humphreys County (north)
Hickman County (northeast)
Lewis County (southeast)
Wayne County (south)
Decatur County (west)
Benton County (northwest)

Weather and climate
Perry County has a humid subtropical climate (Köppen Cfa), characterized by hot, humid summers and cold winters. The average winter temperature is 47.8°F (8.8°C), and the average summer temperature is 75.7°F (24.3°C). The record low of −18°F (−27.8°C) occurred on January 24, 1963, and the record high of 105°F (40.6°C) occurred on July 17, 1980. Average seasonal snowfall is 5.5 inches (14cm). Thunderstorms are relatively common in the county, with an average of 53 days per year seeing thunderstorm activity, usually between May and August.

National Weather Service records list sixteen tornadoes which have been reported in Perry County, with the first one recorded in 1909. Out of these, 14 were reported since 1999. The deadliest tornado recorded in the county happened on May 27, 1917, which killed five and injured an additional 67 people. Its intensity was estimated as EF/4. Perry County was also struck during the May 5, 1999, tornado outbreak. It was hit by the strongest tornado reported during the outbreak, killing three people and causing substantial damage to Linden. Another deadly tornado hit the county during the December 23, 2015, outbreak, with two killed.

Flora and fauna
About 80% of the county is wooded. Numerous species of economically important timber trees are found in the county, including white oak, walnut, black oak, hickory, and chestnut oak. 561 species of wild plants have been collected in the county. Perry County has numerous native game species, including whitetail deer, rabbit, eastern wild turkey, gray squirrel, and fox squirrel. Bobwhite quail are also present, however the population is low due to a lack of suitable habitat. Mourning dove nesting populations are typically also low, although large numbers transit the area during seasonal migrations. Common migratory waterfowl found in the county include wood duck, mallard, gadwall, Canada goose, and the Buffalo River and its tributaries are noted wood duck nesting locations. Mink, muskrat, and beaver are found throughout wetlands in the county. There are large populations of bobcat, opossum, gray fox, striped skunk, and coyote, as well as numerous species of reptiles, amphibians, and birds. Numerous fish species, including largemouth bass, smallmouth bass, crappie, and catfish are found in the rivers and streams of the county, and fishing is a driver of tourism in the county. The value  of the large amount of game and fish found in the county was reported as early as 1932, and continues to be a major driver of tourism in the county.

Wildlife reintroduction
By the late 1940s, fewer than 1,000 whitetail deer were found in the state, having been hunted to the brink of extirpation. In the early 1930s, the Tennessee Game and Fish Commission, the United States Forest Service, the Tennessee Valley Authority, and the United States Navy began restocking efforts on public lands in the State. In 1949, the Game and Fish Commission began their first reintroduction effort in Perry County on public lands, later expanding reintroductions to private lands in the 1950s. By the 1950s, the populations had grown large enough to sustain a limited degree of hunting. In 1960, 30 deer were harvested in the county; by 1996, that number had risen to nearly 2,200.

By the 1950s, wild turkeys had been eliminated from the county. A reintroduction and habitat management program was started by the Tennessee Wildlife Resources Agency (the successor agency to the Game and Fish Commission), leading to the successful return of the species to the county. While the overall number of turkeys is moderate, good local populations are found within certain areas.

Demographics

2020 census

As of the 2020 United States census, there were 8,366 people in 2,929 households residing in the county. The average household size was 2.68. A language other than English was spoken at home by 6.5% of the population.

Economy

Agriculture makes up a significant portion of the economy of Perry County. In 2017, 287 farms were in operation, averaging 215 acres each. Over 35,000 acres of land were utilized for a variety of agricultural activities, including crop production, forestry, and pasture land. A 2018 study showed that agriculture and ag-supporting industries contributed $49.6 million to the county's economy, with 525 jobs (about 17% of total employment in the county). Over 23,000 acres, totaling about 10% of the county's area, are rated by the USDA as prime farmland. In 1999, the USDA's National Agricultural Statistics Service reported that 3,200 acres were planted in corn, 2,600 were planted in soybeans, and another 300 acres were left fallow as part of a conservation program. Additional smaller acreages were planted with sorghum, snap beans, watermelons, and sweet corn. Pasture and hay production utilized nearly 30,000 acres of farmland in the county.

Tourism in Perry County has increased in recent years and does have an impact on the local economy, though it remains limited by a lack of accommodations. In 2021, tourist expenditures in the county totaled $5.8 million, surpassing pre-pandemic spending by $600,000. This spending generated around $200,000 in local taxes, and 54 jobs totaling about $900,000 in wages were created through tourism-related employment. In 2007, the Perry County Chamber of Commerce began a concentrated marketing effort to draw more nature-oriented tourists to the area, using the slogan "Perry County: It's Just Our Nature". In 2008, the first annual Blooming Arts Festival was held in Linden in a further attempt to draw more tourists to the area.  Only one hotel operates in Perry County, the Commodore Hotel in Linden.

The earliest known bank in Perry County was organized by 1890 as the Linden Bank and Trust. It experienced a series of mergers and buyouts, and is now a branch of FirstBank. The other bank operating in the county, the Bank of Perry County, was organized in 1905 as the Bank of Lobelville. By 1975, it had opened branches in both Lobelville and Linden.

Poverty and unemployment
As of 2021, the county was listed as an Appalachian Regional Commission distressed county, ranking it at or near the bottom of Tennessee counties in terms of poverty rate, unemployment, and income. Perry County ranks below the statewide average in numerous economic indicators. Perry County's Gini coefficient is .54, indicating a significantly higher level of income inequality than the rest of Tennessee. As of 2020, the gross domestic product of all industries in the county was $190 million. In 2019, the poverty rate in the county was estimated at 16.1%, three percent higher than the statewide average. The median household income was $41,034, and the per capita income was $27,970. Property values in the county are significantly below the statewide average. In 2019, the median value of owner-occupied housing was $88,100, compared to $167,200 statewide. The rate of owner-occupied housing however, was significantly higher at 82% versus the statewide average of 66%. Numerous challenges to economic expansion exist within the county, including a lack of reliable broadband internet access, no four-lane or controlled access highways, and no nearby US Department of Agriculture certified livestock meat processing. 

Perry County was severely impacted by the economic recession of 2008 and 2009.  Unemployment reached nearly 29%, which at the time was the highest in the state of Tennessee, and the second highest in the United States. The high unemployment rate was due to the closure of a major automotive parts plant that employed a significant portion of the county's residents. Governor Phil Bredesen made Perry County a focus of his state stimulus package in an effort to lower unemployment. Within two years, the unemployment rate was lowered to 14%, a reduction partially attributed to the governor's subsidized employment program. In 2012, an auto parts supplier opened an injection molded plastics facility in a then-shuttered factory space in Linden, providing over 400 jobs to the local community and substantially relieving unemployment in the county.

In April 2020, seasonally unadjusted unemployment peaked again at over 24%, compared to the state average of 15.6%. In 2020, a rubber parts manufacturer that was the largest employer in Lobelville shut down, significantly adding to the county's unemployment rate. As of October 2022 unemployment in Perry County was the third-highest in the state at 5.2%, behind Scott County and Bledsoe County, compared to the statewide unemployment rate of 3.5%.

Government

The government of Perry County is overseen by a County Mayor and a County Commission. The County Mayor is elected at-large every four years. The county is divided into six districts, each of which elect two Commissioners to the County Commission. Commission meetings are held monthly. Additional elected officials include the property assessor, register of deeds, sheriff, county trustee, and road superintendent.

For the United States House of Representatives, Perry County is part of Tennessee's 7th congressional district. Additionally, the county is part of the 28th District for the state senate and the 72nd district for the state house.

Elections

Historically, like most of Middle Tennessee, Perry County was overwhelmingly Democratic. Although it voted to elect Warren G. Harding in his record popular vote landslide of 1920, otherwise no Republican presidential candidate managed to carry the county up to 2004. It did, though, give a plurality to segregationist Alabama Governor George Wallace in 1968. Since 2000, Perry County has seen a very rapid trend towards the Republican Party typical of many rural southern counties. In 2016, it was only marginally less Republican than the traditional Unionist Republican bastions of East Tennessee.

Cities and towns
Linden, the county seat, is an incorporated town located centrally in the county, at the intersection of U.S. Route 412 and Tennessee State Route 13, to the west of where Route 412 crosses the Buffalo River. Lobelville is an incorporated city located along State Route 13 west of the Buffalo River in the northern portion of the county. In addition to the two incorporated communities, numerous unincorporated populated places are located throughout the county.

Incorporated communities
Linden (county seat)
Lobelville

Unincorporated communities

Beardstown
Bunker Hill
Chestnut Grove
Flatwoods
Pine View
Spring Creek

Incorporated communities by population

Transportation and infrastructure
Transportation infrastructure in Perry County includes one federal highway, numerous state highways, and one general aviation airport. No railroads or interstate highways are present within the county. Although the western border of the county is a major navigable waterway, no commercial docks or marinas are located in the county. No public  transportation systems or commercial scheduled passenger services operate in the county. According to a 2015 study, Perry County commuters drove alone to work at the highest rate of any county in Tennessee, reflecting low access to carpooling opportunities or public transportation.

Major highways

Airports
Perry County is served by a small public general aviation airport, James Tucker Airport, constructed in 1962 south of Linden. A private-use helipad (FAA identifier 5TN8) was located at the now-closed Perry Community Hospital in Linden.

Pipelines
Tennessee Gas Pipeline operates a natural gas pipeline that bisects Perry County. A pumping station for the line is located in Lobelville, and was one of the largest pumping stations in the United States when it was constructed. This station and sections of the nearby pipeline are a listed EPA Superfund site. A lawsuit against the pipeline company concerning both the pipeline and the pumping station alleged the release of PCB contaminants into the local environment. As a result of this release, one study determined that those exposed suffered various neurological problems, including slowed reaction speeds and cognition problems.

Telecommunications and electric power
In 1900, Bell Telephone Company established service in the county. Lines were run from the north, diverging from the lines along the railroad in Waverly.

Typical of many rural counties, the rate of broadband internet adoption and availability remains low, with about 59% of households reporting access to broadband internet, compared to 78% statewide, .

Electric power in the county is provided through Meriwether Lewis Electric Cooperative, a non-profit utility cooperative that distributes power purchased from the Tennessee Valley Authority. Many parts of the county did not have electric service until after the middle of the 20th century. Some population centers, such as the community of Flatwoods in southern Perry County, didn't receive power until 1950.

Education
Perry County has one unified school district, the Perry County School System, with four schools. The district is managed by the Perry County Board of Education. The county's first high school was opened in Linden in 1922. Prior to that, all students wishing to have an education beyond the 8th grade had to attend school outside of the county. The county's current high school, Perry County High School, was established in 1963 in Linden with the consolidation of the high schools in Linden and Lobelville. The consolidation was controversial for a number of reasons. Due to the distance from Linden, as well as concerns that the new school would not be ready for the beginning of the 1963 school year, numerous parents and school administrators in Lobelville resisted the consolidation. In 1963, a special district was granted to Lobelville by the state legislature, however the State Board of Education said the district did not qualify for any funds and would not be accredited. This was an effort by the State to force the consolidation of the county's school districts. A group of Lobelville parents sued to keep the school district open, with volunteer teachers filling in for the 1963 school year. The case went to the Tennessee Supreme Court where it affirmed in 1964 that the State Board of Education was within its rights to deny funding to the special school district with the justification that there was an insufficient number of students in the proposed special district to justify expenditure of resources. The consolidation went forward with the Lobelville school closing later that year.

Prior to the passage of the 1964 Civil Rights Act, the county exploited loopholes in state and federal laws to prevent black children from attending high school in the county. In 1954, the county hired a local black farmer and Korean War veteran, McDonald Craig, to drive a bus to transport black children to attend high school out of the county. Using a school bus he purchased from a local Chevrolet dealer, who also happened to be descended from Craig's enslaved grandparents' owners, Craig bussed black students to Montgomery High School in Lexington, Tennessee. This bussing program lasted until the fall of 1965, when the county's schools were integrated.

The county's high school graduation rate is very high, at 97.5%, versus a statewide average of 90.4%. Approximately 75% of the population over age 25 has a high school diploma or equivalent, while 12% have a bachelor's degree or higher. Both are significantly below the statewide averages of 87% and 27%, respectively.

In 1947, the county established a board and funding for a public library. By 1986 two public libraries had been established, one in Linden and another in Lobelville.

Perry County High School

Linden Elementary School
Linden Middle School
Lobelville Elementary School

Media and entertainment

Throughout its history, numerous radio stations and newspapers have existed in Perry County. , the county is served by two radio stations, one each on the AM and FM bands, as well as one weekly newspaper. Six different newspapers are known to have been printed in the county, starting in 1880 with the Linden Times. Subsequent newspapers included the Linden Mail (1890s to 1910s), the New Age (1900s to 1920s), the Perry County News (1913 to late 1910s), and the Perry Countian (1924 to 1978). In 1976, the Buffalo River Review began publication, which merged with the Perry Countian in 1978 and continues today as a weekly paper.

The Buffalo River Review

WOPC (FM)
WMAK (AM)

Film
In 1957, the film Natchez Trace starring Zachary Scott, Marcia Henderson, and William Campbell, and directed by Alan Crosland, Jr. was filmed in Flatwoods. Numerous locals appeared as extras in the lost film which chronicled the life of John Murrell, a bandit who operated in the area in the early 19th century.

Sports and athletics
While Perry County does not currently host any professional or semi-professional athletics teams, historically at least two semi-professional baseball organizations operated in the county. From the 1920s to the late 1940s, both Lobelville and Linden fielded teams, and baseball was considered the prime pastime for residents of the county. It was of such popularity that rivalry games on holidays would be accompanied by noted musical acts, including at least one appearance by Bill Monroe, widely considered the father of bluegrass music. Linden's team, the Owls, won at least three state baseball championships. 

Perry County high school athletic teams have achieved some notability in state-wide competitions, especially in basketball. In 1955, Linden High School began a three-year streak of winning the state high school boys' basketball championship. Following Linden High School's consolidation with Lobelville High School, Perry County High School again won boys' basketball state championships in 1976, 1977, and 1997.

Health and healthcare
In November 2020, the sole hospital in the county, Perry Community Hospital in Linden, announced it would be closing temporarily. Shortly prior to this, the hospital had announced cessation of all services except for the emergency room. The hospital did not reopen, however, and as of 2022 there were no plans to reopen. Prior to its closure, the hospital had over $2 million in accounts payable due. In 2019, the hospital had come under investigation by insurance provider BlueCross BlueShield of Tennessee for over $4.5 million in overpayments due to improper billing practices.

Perry County is served by a local health department that provides basic healthcare services, including vaccinations, disease testing, primary care, and pediatrics. In addition to services provided by the health department, a small clinic funded by a Rural Health Initiative Grant was constructed in 1979 to provide essential outpatient services in the county.

As of 2019, 14.5% of the county's population under the age of 65 lacked health insurance. Additionally, 15.6% of the population under the age of 65 was disabled.

COVID-19 pandemic
As of early September 2022, Perry County reported a total of 2,599 COVID-19 cases, along with 56 deaths and 63 hospitalizations. Additionally, as of August 22, 2022, 42.8% of the county's population was fully vaccinated against COVID-19, nearly 15% below the state-wide vaccination rate.

Notable individuals
Kelsie B. Harder – Professor and onomastician (name scholar)
Kirk Haston – Politician and former professional basketball player
Clyde Milan – Professional baseball player, manager, and coach with the Washington Senators
Thetus W. Sims – Politician and a member of the United States House of Representatives

See also
 National Register of Historic Places listings in Tennessee § Perry County
 List of counties in Tennessee

References

External links

 Perry County Tennessee Government
 Perry County Chamber of Commerce
 The Buffalo River Review
 Perry County, TNGenWeb – free genealogy resources for the county
 Genealogical "Fact Sheets" About Perry County
 

 
1819 establishments in Tennessee
Populated places established in 1819
Middle Tennessee